Jorge Ballesteros Fernández (27 May 1983 – 10 January 2023) was a Spanish sport shooter who took the gold medal overall in the Open division at the 2017 IPSC Handgun World Shoot. At the 2005 World Shoot he took the overall bronze medal in the Open division, and in 2002 he took the bronze medal in the Junior category. He also won two European Handgun Championship Open division gold medals (2013 and 2016), and won the Spanish Handgun Championship 12 times.

On 11 January 2023, it was announced that Ballesteros had been found in his car with a gunshot wound to his head. He was rushed to the hospital, but died from his injuries. He was 39.

References 

1983 births
2023 deaths
21st-century Spanish people
IPSC shooters
IPSC World Shoot Champions
Spanish male sport shooters
Sportspeople from San Sebastián
Deaths by firearm in Spain